Mihail Neamțu, born 1978, is a Romanian conservative politician. He received a PhD in theology from King's College London and has written several books on politics, religion, and culture.

Life and career

Family and political awakenings
Born in 1978 in Făgăraș, a city at the foot of the Carpathian Mountains, Mihail Neamțu had a first-hand experience of communism, an ideology which he often described in harsh pejorative terms. His mother, Emilia, was a school teacher and his father, Gheorghe, was a computer engineer. Neamțu also has a brother, who is a painter. Early on in his life, his paternal grandfather introduced him to the elaborate rituals of Orthodox Christianity, which included a morning Easter service, as well as an exposition of the biblical teachings about life and death.

On 21 December 1989, on the western frontier of Romania with Hungary, Mihail's father directly faced the lethal threats of Nicolae Ceaușescu’s army, made of gunmen, soldiers, tanks, and military trucks. This left a lasting impression on Mihail's political imagination. Since then, he saw liberty ‘as the most important gift in life’.

Education and academic career
In 1996, at the age of 17, he won the First Prize in the National Contest for Philosophy. In his undergraduate studies, Neamțu acquired an elementary knowledge of Greek and Latin, while being drawn to German hermeneutics and French phenomenology.

After having completed his B.A degree at Babeș-Bolyai University in Cluj-Napoca, Neamțu went to study theology at the Ludwig Maximilian University of Munich in Germany. There, he developed a keen interest in the patristic era by looking at the development of Christian doctrine between 325 and 381 A.D.

His extensive readings included the works of Greek and Latin Church Fathers, such as Irenaeus of Lyon, Athanasius the Great, Gregory of Nyssa, Augustine of Hippo, as well as Evagrius of Pontus, John Damascene and Gregory Palamas. In parallel, the social conditions of former Soviet countries, as well as the vivid memories of his own life under dictatorship, moved Neamțu's intellectual focus in the area of Western political philosophy. Thus, he became acquainted with the great classical tradition, from Plato and Aristotle to Baruch Spinoza, Georg Wilhelm Friedrich Hegel, Karl Marx, and Fyodor Dostoevsky.

He gradually developed a critical view of radical modernity, because he believes the latter divorces reason from faith, personal virtue and public legality, economic flourishing and civic duty, sex from love, the visible from the invisible.

Doctoral dissertation
In 2002, Neamțu completed his Master of Arts research at Durham University, with his dissertation "Theology and Language in St Gregory of Nyssa" written under the supervision of Andrew Louth. The same year, he embarked on a doctoral research at King's College London, where he worked with Colin Gunton and Professor Oliver Davies.

In 2008, Neamțu defended his doctoral dissertation at King's College London. His unpublished thesis looks at various points of theological convergence between the supporters of the Nicene Creed and the leaders of the Christian monastic movement in fourth-century Egypt. Neamțu claimed that the Church bishops gathered at Nicene offered a paradoxical understanding of the consubstantial relationship between the Father and the Son, which subverted the Master and Slave dialectics so rampant in the pagan world (as it is described by Hegel in the Phenomenology of Spirit). The Nicene Creed gives meaning to the monastic appropriation of Christian discipleship.

The Nicene understanding of divine incarnation leads to the unfolding of ‘desert eschatology’ in terms of a liturgical suspension of secular history. Finally, Neamțu highlights the desert fathers’ implicit critique of the imperial cult, against the background of an Arian political theology. The marriage between the Nicene doctrine of God and the desert fathers’ practice of virtue is seen as the matrix of emergence for a new Christian understanding of ethics, time, liturgy, and sociality (i.e., politeia).

Political views

Conservative libertarianism
Upon his arrival back to Romania, Neamțu became a diligent student of liberty. While living in Bucharest, he started to attend private seminars and public workshops focused on the works of Alexis de Tocqueville, Lord Acton, Ludwig von Mises, Friedrich von Hayek, Milton Friedman and William F. Buckley Jr.

Neamțu has travelled extensively to many destinations in North America, Asia, Europe, and the Middle East. As an affiliate researcher of various conservative NGOs and libertarian think-tanks, he has put together different projects, conferences, and workshops, dedicated to the question of individual liberty and the impact of the governmental action upon the free market and the civil society. He is an Eurosceptic.

Multiculturalism and immigration
Neamțu is against any type of multiculturalism or immigration and he identifies such things as left-wing politics. Regarding the Bucharest Mosque project, he was one of the main critics of it.

Political commentator
For nearly two decades, Neamțu has wrote various essays and columns on a variety of topics such as entrepreneurship, rule of law, education, home-schooling, terrorism, Marxist ideology, and political corruption.

Media appearances
As a public speaker, Dr Neamțu has addressed small and large crowds. He also interacted with thinkers, church leaders, and CEOs across various geographic and cultural lines. He has appeared on Sky News, Euronews, as well as on other various news stations and national televisions.

Political activity

The New Republic 
On 17 September 2011, Neamțu published a political manifesto calling for the establishment of ‘a New Republic’. In his foundational document, he said that the citizens of the free world should enter an age of personal responsibility, while politicians should fully grasp, in quasi-Burkean fashion, the meaning of a ‘trans-generational accountability’. The New Republic Party also called for the spiritual renewal of the Western civilization by restoring the moral dignity of the Judeo-Christian tradition. The movement reached its peak when thousands of individuals registered as members in forty national constituencies.

Work with the President of Romania
By mid-July 2012, Neamțu became actively involved in helping Traian Băsescu, former President of Romania, to prevent his impeachment. Like Băsescu, he was also against the Bucharest Mosque.

The European Conservatives
In 2013, the New Republic Party became member of the Alliance of European Conservatives and Reformists. As president of the New Republic Party, Neamțu worked with various members of the European Parliament, such as the British MEP Daniel Hannan and former prosecutor Monica Macovei.

Controversies 
Some journalists have published articles that supported the claim that Neamțu might be using his public display of Christian values as a cover up to his closeted homosexuality.

Mihail Neamțu has publicly collaborated with Herbalife, which was criticized by part of the Romanian press because the company is considered a pyramid scheme.

As a theologian and philosopher, Mihail Neamțu has on several occasions argued the incompatibility between Christianity and Legionarism. In an article in România libera, Neamțu wrote:

Neither the martyr end of figures such as Valeriu Gafencu, killed by the Communists, exonerates the errors and horrors produced by the so-called "ethics of honour". Who can justify the shooting of Virgil Madgearu, Armand Calinescu or Nicolae Iorga? What about the suicide provocation of Petre Andrei, the scholar from Iasi who was merciless against fascism? No less serious is Codreanu's unconditional support for the Berlin-Rome axis? The furious hatred of parliamentarianism and the democratic elite cannot be justified even by the anti-Legionary persecutions of the Carlist dictatorship.

As a teenager, Neamțu published texts favourable to C.Z. Codreanu, leader of the Legionary Movement. Thus, in issue 11/47, p. 14 of 1994 of the Siberian magazine Puncte Cardinale, still a minor, Neamțu wrote the following:

"Let us ask ourselves then why these numerous "intellectuals", many of them journalists, historians or political analysts [...], cannot understand the Legion and its Captain? They cannot understand why the Iron Guard was first and foremost a spiritual movement, a school for the restoration of the Romanian soul, in which, as Codreanu said (listening to Christ's teaching, Mark 11, 23), 'he who believes without limits' enters and 'he who doubts' remains outside' "

In a book published in 2010, Mihail Neamțu explained the sympathies betrayed by this article published at the age of 16, describing them as "childish paragraphs" and blaming them on "historical and sentimental ignorance", against the background of which he allowed himself to be influenced by discussions with former political prisoners in Arad in the context of a "crisis of values [and a] need for reference points for an entire generation formed after 1989". He disavowed those texts, stating that he had no argument for "equating the cultural excellence of the 1927 generation with its political choice" and that he was "not in tune with the endemic violence and racial policies of the 1940 Legionary government".

Mihail Neamțu's teenage legionary sympathies returned to public attention with the launch of the ARD electoral alliance in November 2012 when he recited verses from the work of the poet Radu Gyr, which led to the other ARD leaders distancing themselves from the symbolism Neamțu used in the campaign.  The Centre for Monitoring and Combating Anti-Semitism in Romania issued a statement describing Mihail Neamțu's speech as ''scandalous, outrageous and against the law''.

Some journalists, such as Alex Ștefănescu (literary critic), Robert Turcescu (journalist) or Grigore Cartianu (publicist), commented positively on Mihail Neamțu's decision to recite a poem dedicated to the memory of the Romanian peasant.

Electoral history

Mayor of Sector 3
{| class=wikitable width=50%
! rowspan=2|Election
! rowspan=2|Affiliation
! colspan=3|First round
|-
!Votes
!Percentage
!Position
|-align=center
! 2020
|  || 9,593 ||  || 
|}

 Books 
As an academic, Mihai Neamțu has authored over a hundred critical essays, articles and book review on politics, philosophy, theology, and culture. Most of his books defend the cultural contributions of Christianity and the political values of classical liberalism. Some of his scholarly essays have been published by Oxford University Press, Ashgate, and Brepols.

 The Trump Arena (2017) 

His latest book on Donald Trump and the soul of America had been inspired by an Eastern European experience of life, business, and politics.

Philosopher and theologian, familiar with the history of Late Antiquity, Mihai Neamtu describes what he sees as the clash between the Trump movement and the corrupt establishment of Washington D.C. in terms similar to the martial games held in the Roman Colosseum. He claimed, the sword of the combatant was Trump's Twitter account. According to his analysis, Trump's enemies were a legion of politicians, highbrow academics, journalists, and sold-out experts. Questions posed in his book include: why did the American people cast their vote in favor of an underdog? What was the crowd's reaction to Barack Obama's arrogance? How was it possible for Donald Trump to defeat the Hollywood consensus and mainstream media bias against him? Why did the Christian communities grant their support to a folksy, foul-mouthed, and highly unconventional character? The book attempts to provide answers to those questions from a decidedly Eastern European perspective.

 The Ages of Love (2016) 
This best-seller tells three stories of love. At the International Gaudeamus Book Fest held in Bucharest (18–20 Nov 2016), a plethora of writers, journalists, diplomats or theologians hailed this essay. Dr Adrian Papahagi praised the author for being capable to decipher the sacred halo of agape within the filigree of the profane love. The fiction of the archetypal child, Mowgli, mesmerised by Shanti, is combined with the story between the teenagers, Mihnea and Dora. Both stories lead to the climactic end exposed in the letter of two Eastern European intellectuals (Dinu and Nelli Pillat). A book of admirable encounters that can easily make you fall in love with them.'

 Zeitgeist (2010) 
In Zeitgeist, Neamțu offers an assessment of the moral, social, and economic legacy of Communism in Eastern Europe. He discusses everyday life, the question of political violence and institutional corruption, arts and material culture, as well as the Romanian history of dissidence and collaboration under dictatorship. Neamțu has systematically denounced the ‘negative influence of Soviet-style propaganda’, which attempts to weaken the notion of property, liberty, and the rule of law in all of Russia's neighboring countries.

 The Burden of Freedom (2009) 
This book (prefaced by Professor Vladimir Tismaneanu) is one of his most scholarly in style, as it pertains to the Western history of political ideas. Neamțu attempts to critically assess the two extremes of radical modernity. First, the author discusses Spinoza's biblical exegesis and the birth of secular liberal democracy; then, he looks at Carl Schmitt's attack on the rationalism of the Enlightenment. As a result, Neamțu searches for a third-way, as it is revealed by the American exceptionalism (illustrated by the works of Jaroslav Pelikan and William F. Buckley Jr). As a champion of economic freedom, Neamțu also defended the intrinsic virtues of entrepreneurship, claiming that those who create wealth and abundance in a world of scarcity echo the divine transformation of a formless reality (the biblical tohu-bohu) into a living garden.

The Grammar of Orthodoxy (2007)
This book looks at the dialogue between faith and reason, between Orthodox theology and secular philosophy. It looks at the works of Michael Polanyi, Hans-Georg Gadamer, and Paul Ricœur; it critically examines the ‘Radical Orthodoxy’ movement and the socialist doctrine of John Milbank; it critiques the objectifying of the human body with the help of Michel Henry's phenomenology.

The Owl among the Ruins (2005)
Neamțu's first popular book (published in 2005 under the title The Owl Among the Ruins and nominated for a national debut award) looks at the ambivalent relationship between the Church and the State before and after the collapse of Communism. The author outlines the moral differences between the Polish Catholic Church under Wojciech Jaruzelski and the Romanian Orthodox Church under the political regime of Nicolae Ceaușescu. Mihai Neamțu was also among the first Christian writers to tackle the question of collaboration between the Secret Police (Securitate) and the clergy. The book also looks at the spiritual needs of the youth (including the representatives of the Roma community) in the age of consumerism.

 Bibliography (selective) 

 Other books Faith and Reason. Conversations, Contradictions, Mediation, 2013.Zeitgeist. Cultural Patterns and Ideological Conflicts, 2010.The Verb as Photography. Cultural dissidents and political commentaries, 2009.The Conservative elegies. East-European Reflections on Religion and Society, 2009.

 Edited books Memory, Humanism and Meaning. Essays in honor of Andrei Pleșu’s sixtieth anniversary, offered by NEC alumni & friends, Bucharest: Zeta Books, 2009, edited together with Bogdan Tătaru-Cazaban.A Philosophy of Distance. In Honorem Andrei Pleșu, Bucharest,  Humanitas Publishing house, 2009, coordinated together with Bogdan Tătaru-Cazaban.

 Scholarly research 

‘The Theologico-Political Constitution of Monastic Liturgy,’ in Adrian Pabst and Christoph Schneider (ed.), Encounter between Eastern Orthodoxy and Radical Orthodoxy. Transfiguring the World through the Word (Aldershot: Ashgate, 2008), 249–270.

‘Liturgical Orality or Textualist Oblivion? A Case-Study: Printing the Scriptures into Romanian (16th–18th century), St Vladimir’s Theological Quarterly, vol. 52 (2008) 3–4: 367–88.

‘Between the Gospel and the Nation: Dumitru Stăniloae’s Ethno-Theology,’ Archæus. Studies in the History of Religions, vol. 10 (2006) 3: 9–46.

‘Protology of Language in St Gregory of Nyssa,’ Khora. Revue d’études patristiques et médiévales, vol. 1 (2003) 1: 51–78.

‘Revisiting Orthodoxy and Nationalism,’ Pro Ecclesia, vol. 15 (2006) 2: 153–160.

 Translations 
Andrew Louth, Discerning the Mystery. Essay on the nature of theology, 1999.
Jean-Luc Marion, The Cross of the Visible, 2000.
John Behr, The Way to Niceea, 2004.
Hugo Tristram Engelhardt Jr., The Foundations of Christian Bioethics'', 2005.

References

External links 
Official blog
http://www.libertylawsite.org/author/mihail-neamtu/
http://www.donald-trump.ro 

1978 births
Living people
Patristic scholars
Alumni of Durham University
Alumni of King's College London
Eastern Orthodox philosophers
Babeș-Bolyai University alumni
Ludwig Maximilian University of Munich alumni
Romanian male writers
Conservatism in Romania
Critics of multiculturalism
Critics of Marxism
Romanian anti-communists
Anti-globalization writers
Republicans
Christian fundamentalists
People from Făgăraș
Anti-Islam sentiment in Europe
Romanian anti-abortion activists
Eurosceptics
Far-right politics in Romania
Critics of atheism
Euroscepticism in Romania
Male critics of feminism
Anti-same-sex-marriage activists